Joseph Sipendi (19 March 1915 - 29 April 1985) was a Tanzanian clergyman and bishop for the Roman Catholic Diocese of Moshi, having previously been Bishop of Zanzibar.

Biography

In 1928 Joseph Sipendi attended the minor seminary in Kilema. From 1937 to 1945 Sipendi studied in Rome, where he obtained degrees in Catholic theology and canon law He received the Sacrament of Holy Orders on December 20, 1942. From 1966 to 1968 Sipendi was Apostolic Administrator of Zanzibar and Pemba.

On January 11, 1968, Pope Paul VI appointed him Bishop of Moshi. The bishop of Bukoba, Laurean Cardinal Rugambwa, conferred episcopal consecration on him on 24 March of the same year at Christ the King Cathedral in Moshi; his Co-consecrators were Archbishop of Tabora, Marko Mihayo, and Bishop Emeritus of Moshi, Joseph Kilasara, CSSp. He died in 1985.

References

External Links

 http://41.86.178.5:8080/xmlui/bitstream/handle/123456789/9709/Daily%20News%20April%2027%2c1985%2c%20Page%203%2cSaturday.jpg?sequence=1&isAllowed=y

20th-century Roman Catholic bishops in Tanzania
1915 births
1985 deaths
Roman Catholic bishops of Moshi
Roman Catholic bishops of Zanzibar